The Quilt is the fourth studio album by the American rap rock band Gym Class Heroes, released by Fueled By Ramen/Decaydance on September 9, 2008.

Half of the album's 14 tracks are produced by Patrick Stump of Fall Out Boy, Cool & Dre, Tricky Stewart.  Allstar produced the rest. Featured artists on the record include Busta Rhymes, Estelle, The-Dream and Daryl Hall of Hall & Oates. Additional background vocals on the album are provided by Patrick Stump, Patty Crash, Andre Leon and Lyndsey Ray. Pete Wentz of Fall Out Boy is also credited with working on a track.

Before the album was released, frontman Travie McCoy said, "It's just gonna be a real, real solid record. The demos we have now are just bananas, ...(Guitarist) Disashi is just a monster on the new stuff. You're going to hear a lot more of him singing on this one and a lot more of his guitar skills that I don't think he really got to flex on the last record."

The album debuted at number fourteen on the Billboard 200 with 32,266 copies sold in its first-week.

Singles
The first single from the album was "Peace Sign/Index Down" which featured Busta Rhymes. It made no impact globally so it was released alongside "Blinded By The Sun" and "Cookie Jar" featuring The-Dream. A video was shot for both "Peace Sign/Index Down" and "Cookie Jar" as they were official singles whereas "Blinded by the Sun" was a pre-release single from the album.

The next single from the album was "Guilty as Charged" featuring Estelle. The song was premiered on UK radio November 1 and Gym Class Heroes later shot a video for the song in Las Vegas.

The song "Don't Tell Me It's Over" originally featured Lil Wayne.

While not released as a single, the song "Home" was used on Madden NFL 09 without the minute-long introduction.

"Live a Little"'s music video was uploaded to YouTube on November 17, 2009.

Early release
In some stores, notably Future Shop, The Quilt was released before the release date, September 9.

iTunes version
Along with the normal 14-track album, iTunes offered an extended edition for $12.99 that included three "Stressed Out Remix" versions of "Cookie Jar" and "Blinded By the Sun" and music videos of "Peace Sign / Index Down" and "Cookie Jar".

Commercial performance
The Quilt debuted at number 14 in the US Billboard 200 chart, selling 32,266 copies in its first week, becoming the group's highest peaking album on the chart. By October 2009, the album had sold 108,000 copies in the United States.

In the United Kingdom, the album debuted at number 41 in the UK Albums Chart, even though the second single from the album became their third top ten hit in the UK.

Track listing

Charts

Weekly charts

References
 Citations

Sources

External links
 

Gym Class Heroes albums
2008 albums
Albums produced by Cool & Dre
Albums produced by Tricky Stewart
Fueled by Ramen albums